The 2019 Manchester Trophy was a professional tennis tournament played on outdoor grass courts. It was the third edition of the women's tournament which was part of the 2019 ITF Women's World Tennis Tour. It took place in Manchester, United Kingdom between 10 and 16 June 2019.

Singles main-draw entrants

Seeds

 1 Rankings are as of 27 May 2019.

Other entrants
The following players received wildcards into the singles main draw:
  Alicia Barnett
  Naomi Broady
  Gabriella Taylor
  Emily Webley-Smith

The following players received entry from the qualifying draw:
  Vivian Heisen
  Mayo Hibi
  Maddison Inglis
  Yuriko Lily Miyazaki
  Samantha Murray
  Ingrid Neel

Champions

Singles

 Magda Linette def.  Zarina Diyas, 7–6(7–1), 2–6, 6–3

Doubles

 Duan Yingying /  Zhu Lin def.  Robin Anderson /  Laura Ioana Paar, 6–4, 6–3

References

External links
 2019 Manchester Trophy at ITFtennis.com
 Official website

2019 ITF Women's World Tennis Tour
2019 in British sport